Donald Joseph Qualls (born June 10, 1978) is an American actor. He is best known for his work in films including Road Trip (2000), The New Guy (2002) and The Core (2003), and for several appearances on television series such as Breaking Bad, Supernatural, Scrubs, Lost, CSI: Crime Scene Investigation. He co-starred in the FX comedy series Legit, the Syfy horror series Z Nation and the Amazon Studios show The Man in the High Castle.

Early life
Qualls was born in Nashville, Tennessee, one of five children of Donnie and Janice Qualls. He was raised in Manchester, Tennessee, and attended school in nearby Tullahoma. He was diagnosed with Hodgkin's lymphoma at age fourteen. After two years of treatment, his cancer was said to be in remission. According to Qualls, the chemotherapy at an early age sped up his metabolism and impacted his growth, "It stopped my development," which explains his slender frame. After graduating from Coffee County Central High School in 1995, where he was an active member in the Red Raider Band, Qualls attended King's College London, where he studied English literature. He returned to Tennessee, enrolling at Belmont University in Nashville, where he also began acting in a local theater company.

Career
Qualls was an extra in the 1994 HBO film Against the Wall. He landed the small role of Jason in the miniseries Mama Flora's Family (1998) while participating in community theater. After auditioning for a one-liner in Road Trip (2000), he was asked to come from the Atlanta office to meet producer Ivan Reitman in California. He debuted in Road Trip as shy virgin Kyle Edwards. After this, he worked as a model for Prada and photographers such as David LaChapelle and Steve Klein. In Cherry Falls (2000), he played Wally, another virgin. In 2001, he played Neil Lawrence in Chasing Holden. Qualls also appeared as a Y2K prophet opposite Rami Malek in the sci-fi mystery thriller Buster's Mal Heart (2017).

In 2002, Qualls played Archie in the film Comic Book Villains, Andrew in the film Big Trouble, Junior in the film Lone Star State of Mind, Dizzy Gillespie Harrison in the film The New Guy, and Rat in the sci-fi film The Core. He starred in the comedy Delta Farce. In 2005, he appeared as Shelby in the film Hustle & Flow. His television work includes eccentric hunter Garth Fitzgerald IV on Supernatural and appearances on Monk, Scrubs, Criminal Minds, Lost, Law & Order: Criminal Intent, CSI, Numb3rs, My Name Is Earl, Breaking Bad, The Big Bang Theory, and Memphis Beat.

Qualls appeared in a cameo in Britney Spears' music video "Boys" (2002) and was also in the "I'm Just a Kid" music video by Simple Plan (2002). He starred in the Paramount Pictures web series Circle of Eight. He co-starred on the television series Legit as Billy Nugent, a 33-year-old man with muscular dystrophy.

Personal life 
In January 2020, Qualls came out as gay on his Twitter account, stating he was "tired of worrying about what it would do to my career," after announcing it at a Jim Jefferies show in San Diego.

Filmography

Film

Television

Music videos

Awards and nominations

References

External links

1978 births
20th-century American male actors
21st-century American male actors
American expatriates in England
Alumni of King's College London
American male film actors
American male television actors
Belmont University alumni
Film producers from Tennessee
American gay actors
LGBT people from Tennessee
Living people
Male actors from Memphis, Tennessee
Male actors from Nashville, Tennessee
People from Manchester, Tennessee
21st-century LGBT people